Volunteer Partnerships for West Africa (VPWA) is a volunteer-driven, non-profit NGO based in Ghana, which aims to promote better life opportunities for people in underprivileged communities through sustainable development initiatives. VPWA has pioneered several social innovations in the region, including micro leasing, the establishment of a Children and Youth Development Centre in the Eastern Region of Ghana, and campaigns such as Deworm Ghana, Green Ghana, Kick Malaria Out, and Street Library.

History 

Volunteer Partnerships for West Africa was founded in 2007 by Ghanaian social entrepreneur Hayford Siaw. Initially set-up to offer only international volunteer placement programmes in Anglophone West-African countries, the organization and its partners have since expanded in scope. With the help of volunteers across the international community, the organization now implements strategic sustainable development initiatives through Economic Empowerment Initiatives, Environmental Reclamation programs, and Microfinance & Leasing inter alia, to alleviate the difficulties faced by disadvantaged communities and people in the region.

Mission and objectives 

VPWA work is based on its commitment to fulfill the UN Millennium Development Goals  and thus it defends an integrated approach to sustainable development. That means that its projects not only aim to lift people out of poverty but also to:
promote education: VPWA realizes Micro-Finance, Entrepreneurship and Vocational Training for the less privileged people.
reduce illiteracy and help to eradicate incidences of child labor.
advance energy and environmental policies.
strengthen resources to prevent and respond to crises.
fight the spread of HIV/AIDS and other diseases: VPWA aims to sensitize communities on health-related issues including malaria, HIV-AIDS, tuberculosis and Buruli Ulcer.

VPWA also networks with other organizations, companies and institutions to implement holistic and solution-oriented projects. The organization believes in individually targeting various social groups such as the youth, women, or the disabled, as agents to further proactive social change.

Ongoing Programs

Microfinance and leasing 

VPWA set-up its microfinance arm in 2009, called MicroQuips, offering micro loans to micro entrepreneurs as a measure against poverty. In this first year of the program VPWA secured 80 loans for the women of Ghana, loaning out GHC11,126 or $8,192. The women have developed numerous business plans such as the procurement of a refrigerator to sell cold drinks, opening general supply stores, and sewing. VPWA also conducts a financial literacy class to teach basic financial management practices, marketing strategies and accounting.

In 2011, VPWA spearheaded the concept of Microleasing in the region, loaning simple tools and machineries to micro entrepreneurs to boost their production and increase efficiency. Aimed at increasing the economic participation of women, the project has served to promote gender equality and improve the welfare of beneficiaries.

Kick Malaria Out (KMO) Campaign 

Launched in 2009, VPWA runs an annual campaign aimed at generating awareness about malaria in West Africa.  KMO strives to educate participants about the rate at which malaria is killing, and to teach measures that can help prevent and minimize the disease and its devastating consequences.

Volunteers conduct workshops in countries such as Ghana, Togo, Benin, Nigeria, Côte d'Ivoire and Liberia, promoting space spraying/ aerial insecticide dispersal  as the most viable solution to permanently eradicate malaria in Africa. In addition, they discourage the use of stopgap measures such as mosquito nets as long-term solutions.

Deworm Ghana 

According to the World Health Organization, worm infections are one of the most common long-term infections of children in low-income countries, and deworming is the most cost-effective method to significantly increase primary school attendance and a child's ability to learn in school.

VPWA's annual Deworm outreach program involves volunteers going from school to school, community to community, treating children against worm infections by administering Mebendazole and Albendazole. Volunteers also encourage parents to regularly seek deworming treatment for their children and explain how cultivating habits such as wearing shoes outside, avoiding non-potable water, and washing fruits and vegetables before consumption can curb the incidence of worm infections.

Green Ghana Volunteers 

Started in 2010, Green Ghana Volunteers is a project involving the planting of Moringa Oleifera trees around the region. The tree is arguably one of the world's most useful trees, as almost every part of the moringa tree can be used for food or has some other beneficial property. In the tropics, it is used as forage for livestock, and in many countries, moringa micronutrient liquid, a natural anthelmintic (kills parasites) and adjuvant (to aid or enhance another drug) is used as a metabolic conditioner to aid against endemic diseases in developing countries. Leaves can be eaten fresh, cooked, or stored as dried powder for many months without refrigeration, and reportedly without loss of nutritional value. Moringa is especially promising as a food source in the tropics because the tree is in full leaf at the end of the dry season when other foods are typically scarce.

By planting the moringa trees on a large scale, the project aims to use low cost resources to generate incomes and create jobs, and in the process rehabilitate degraded land. The cultivated Moringa oleifera leaves are an excellent source of vitamins, minerals and protein.  In addition, they boost food security, foster rural development, and support sustainable landcare, all useful characteristics against the backdrop of Ghana's industrially ravaged landscape and frequent dry seasons. In the long run, the project aims to harvest produce of sufficient sanitary and nutritional status to export.

VPWA Children Centre

VPWA runs a Children Centre conveniently located in the small rural village of DarmangAnhuntem near Nsawam in the Eastern Region. VPWA Children Centre provides improved child care, health, and education, towards well-being of disadvantaged children below the age of 15 in Eastern and Greater Accra regions of Ghana. VPWA arranges a sponsorship program of $45/month from individual donors, to support the overall care at the centre.

Volunteering 

Since 2007, VPWA has been engaged in volunteer recruitment and placement, and recognizes the role of volunteers in its areas of operation. The recruitment process allows both skilled professionals and students to work with VPWA and its partner projects, and contributing directly to the achievement of the Millennium Development Goals. Between 2007 and 2016, over 1500 Volunteers from 70 countries have participated in VPWA's projects in Ghana. Various opportunities are frequently published and updated on its website. Beside onsite volunteering, those unable to travel to Ghana are also given the opportunity to work virtually with VPWA through the United Nations Volunteers Online Volunteering Service. The organization clinched the United Nations Volunteers Award in 2010 and 2011, due to outstanding commitment and contributions by online volunteers.

Partnerships

Street Library Ghana

References

External links
Kids club, OAfrica
Street Library Project
Health Insurance Fund
Teach In Ghana
Ghana Medical Volunteers
Green Ghana Volunteers
Deworm Ghana
Volunteer Opportunities
HAACF

Development in Africa
Non-profit organisations based in Ghana
Economic development organizations